Adam Smith, better known as Doc Adam, is a British-Australian medical doctor and YouTuber who produces videos giving medical advice to a Filipino demographic.

YouTube career

Content
Adam Smith is an Australia-based doctor from England who ran a YouTube channel under the name "Doc Adam". He started making videos on medical advise with the help of his Filipino partner in 2017. A Filipino-speaker himself, Smith caters to a Filipino demographic. Smith used to visit the Philippines through medical missions and as a result has learned how to speak Filipino. He then shifted to giving reviews on products which enjoys endorsements from celebrities and  politicians with various unproven medical claims. He also ran an online shop where he sold health-related products, mostly low-carb and low-sugar food staples as well as Doc Adam branded merchandise.

On Farrah Agustin-Bunch's claims
In late 2020, fellow doctor Farrah Agustin-Bunch sued Smith after he disputed GlutaLipo coffee's slimming and whitening claims. Agustin-Bunch is also the head of GlutaLipo. Smith has also disputed Agustin-Bunch's natural or alternative medicine practices and questioned her training background at Harvard University. Among the other products of Agustin-Bunch previously covered by Smith are Boston C and Pixie Dust magnesium.

This led to Smith's hiatus from YouTube from October to November 2020, and October 2021 to February 2023.

CopperMask PH
In early 2021, Smith made a video about CopperMask PH's copper mask which is distributed by JC Premiere where he pointed out that there is a hole in the china part of the mask. In the video he explained that such mask are not recommended by Philippine and Australian health authorities. The doctor said that he had received cease and desist order for his video from CopperMask PH who believes that Smith is "defaming" the brand.

Hiatus, return and lawsuit with Agustin-Bunch
Smith took a hiatus in YouTube on October 30, 2021, to take a "different direction in life" after his lawsuit with Bunch-Agustin disrupted his professional practice as a doctor and incurred heavy legal cost. Smith would start a crowdfunding campaign since his indemnity insurer won't cover the cost of his case.

Smith on February 6, 2023 announced that he would file a defense lawsuit against Agustin-Bunch using evidence he has accumulated. He accused Agustin-Bunch of discouraging patients to undergo traditional cancer treatment to promote her own products leading to their deaths and the other doctor of humiliating Smith by tasking someone delivering him court papers of the case against him in his clinic during working hours. The delivery was filmed and uploaded into social media. Agustin-Bunch's side maintained that Smith has defamed her through his videos.

He would upload a video on YouTube on February 22, 2023, marking the end of his hiatus where he discussed updates on his lawsuit.

Personal life
Smith is in a relationship with KC, a Filipino woman. When he announced his retirement from YouTube in 2021, Smith said that they planned to get married the following year. However the two were prevented from getting married as of February 2023 due to Smith suffering from anxiety and depression from dealing with a lawsuit with Agustin-Bunch.

External links

References

Health and fitness YouTubers
YouTube critics and reviewers
Living people
Year of birth missing (living people)
21st-century English medical doctors